McGraw Hill is an American educational publishing company and one of the "big three" educational publishers that publishes educational content, software, and services for pre-K through postgraduate education. The company also publishes reference and trade publications for the medical, business, and engineering professions. McGraw Hill operates in 28 countries, has about 4,000 employees globally, and offers products and services to about 140 countries in about 60 languages. Formerly a division of The McGraw Hill Companies (later renamed McGraw Hill Financial, now S&P Global), McGraw Hill Education was divested and acquired by Apollo Global Management in March 2013 for $2.4 billion in cash. McGraw Hill was sold in 2021 to Platinum Equity for $4.5 billion.

History 

McGraw Hill was founded in 1888 when James H. McGraw, co-founder of the company, purchased the American Journal of Railway Appliances. He continued to add further publications, eventually establishing The McGraw Publishing Company in 1899. His co-founder, John A. Hill, had also produced several technical and trade publications and in 1902 formed his own business, The Hill Publishing Company.

In 1909, the two co-founders formed an alliance and combined the book departments of their publishing companies into an incorporated company called The McGraw-Hill Book Company. John Hill served as president, with James McGraw as vice-president. The remaining parts of each business were merged into The McGraw-Hill Publishing Company, Inc in 1917.

In 1946, McGraw-Hill founded an international division of the company. It acquired Contemporary Films in 1972 and CRM in 1975. McGraw-Hill combined its films in the CRM division in 1978. McGraw-Hill sold CRM in 1987.

In 1979, McGraw-Hill Publishing Company purchased  Byte from its owner/publisher Virginia Williamson, who then became a vice-president of McGraw-Hill. In 1986, McGraw-Hill bought out competitor The Economy Company, then the nation's largest publisher of educational material. The buyout made McGraw-Hill the largest educational publisher in the U.S.

In 1988, Harold McGraw became chairman emeritus of the company.

In 1989, McGraw-Hill formed a joint partnership with Robert Maxwell, forming America's second largest textbook publisher. McGraw-Hill took full ownership of the venture in 1993.

In 2004, The McGraw-Hill Companies sold its children's publishing unit to School Specialty. In 2007, The McGraw-Hill Companies launched an online student study network, GradeGuru.com. This offering gave McGraw-Hill an opportunity to connect directly with its end users, the students. The site closed on April 29, 2012.

In 2008, the company acquired Reveal Math. On October 3, 2011, Scripps announced it was purchasing all seven television stations owned by The McGraw-Hill Companies' broadcasting division McGraw-Hill Broadcasting for $212 million; the sale is a result of McGraw-Hill's decision to exit the broadcasting industry to focus on its other core properties, including its publishing unit. This deal was approved by the FTC on October 31 and the FCC on November 29. The deal was completed on December 30, 2011.

On November 26, 2012, The McGraw-Hill Companies announced it was selling its entire education division to Apollo Global Management for $2.5 billion. On March 22, 2013, McGraw Hill Education announced it had completed the sale and the proceeds were for $2.4 billion in cash. In 2012, the company acquired Redbird Learning and in 2013, the company acquired ALEKS. In 2014, McGraw Hill Education India partnered with GreyCampus to promote Online Learning Courses among University Grants Commission- National eligibility Test Aspirants.

On June 30, 2015, McGraw-Hill Education announced that Data Recognition Corporation (DRC) had agreed to acquire "key assets" of the CTB/McGraw-Hill assessment business. In 2016, the company acquired Everyday Mathematics. In 2017, the company acquired My Math.

On May 11, 2017, McGraw-Hill Education announced the sale of the business holdings of McGraw-Hill Ryerson (Ryerson Press) to Canadian educational publisher Nelson.

On May 1, 2019, McGraw-Hill Education announced an agreement to merge with Cengage. The merged company was expected to retain McGraw Hill as the corporate name. The merger was called off on 1 May 2020. In 2019, the company acquired Core-Plus Mathematics Project. In 2020, the company became a distributor for Illustrative Mathematics.

McGraw Hill was sold in 2021 to Platinum Equity for $4.5 billion.

Corporate organization 
Operating segments of McGraw Hill include:

 McGraw Hill PreK–12, which develops curriculum and content for early childhood education, K-12 learners, and adult education.
 McGraw Hill Higher Ed, which focuses on post-secondary education. 
 McGraw Hill Global Professional, focused on post-graduate and professional learners globally.
 McGraw Hill International, which focuses on learners and institutions outside of the United States.

McGraw Hill is also established in Asia, Australia, Canada, (as McGraw-Hill Ryerson) Europe, India, and Latin America (as McGraw-Hill Interamericana). In 2013, McGraw-Hill Education acquired the entirety of shares in Tata McGraw-Hill Education Private Limited, the company's long-existing joint venture with Tata Group in India. The company is now known as McGraw-Hill in India as well.

Acquisitions
During the course of its history, the McGraw Hill Companies expanded significantly through acquisition, not just within the publishing industry but also into other areas such as financial services (the purchase of Standard & Poor's in 1966) and broadcasting (the 1972 acquisition of Time-Life Broadcasting). Many of these acquisitions stayed with McGraw Hill after their acquisition by Apollo Global Management in 2013.

Presidents
 John A. Hill (1909-1917)
 James H. McGraw (1917–1928)
 Johnathan Heflin (1928–1948)
 James McGraw Jr. (1948–1950)
 Curtis W. McGraw (1950–1953)
 Donald C. McGraw (1953–1968)
 Shelton Fisher (1968–1974)
 Harold McGraw Jr. (1974–1983)
 Joseph Dionne (1983–1998)
 Harold W. McGraw III (1998–2013)
 Buzz Waterhouse (2013–2014)
 David Levin (2014–2017)
 Buzz Waterhouse (2017–2018)
 Dr. Nana Banerjee (2018–2019)
 Simon Allen (2019-)

Controversies
In 1980, McGraw-Hill paid the African American writer and civil rights activist James Baldwin a $200,000 advance for his unfinished book Remember This House, a memoir of his personal recollections of civil rights leaders Medgar Evers, Malcolm X and Martin Luther King Jr. Following his death, the company sued his estate to recover the advance they had paid him for the unfinished book. The lawsuit was dropped by the company in 1990, citing a desire not to cause distress to Baldwin's family.

In October 2015, McGraw-Hill Education was accused of whitewashing history after it published a caption in a geography textbook referring to American slaves as "workers". The company quickly apologized, updated the digital version of the materials, and offered schools replacement texts at no charge. It has been linked to broader controversies about texts at the Texas Education Agency.

See also

 
 Books in the United States
 Discovery Education
 Google for Education
 Houghton Mifflin Harcourt
 Pearson Education
 S&P Global
 Scholastic Corporation

References

Further reading

External links
 No More Pencils, No More Books | Slate
 McGraw Hill says digital sales beat print for the first time | Chicago Sun Times

 
2013 mergers and acquisitions
American companies established in 1888
Apollo Global Management companies
Education companies established in 1888
Educational publishing companies
Educational publishing companies of the United States
Gerald Loeb Special Award winners
Publishing companies based in New York City
Publishing companies established in 1888
Textbook publishing companies